Palangabad District is in Eshtehard County, Alborz province, Iran. At the latest census in 2016, the population of the district was 2,625 in 819 households. The largest village in the district is Palangabad, with 1,012 inhabitants.

References 

Eshtehard County

Districts of Alborz Province

Populated places in Alborz Province

Populated places in Eshtehard County